The Episcopal Diocese of Oregon is a diocese of the Episcopal Church which consists of the western portion of the State of Oregon bordered by the Pacific Ocean, the Columbia River, the Cascade Range and the Oregon–California border. Major cities in the diocese are Portland, Salem, Eugene and Medford. The diocese is a part of Province VIII of the Episcopal Church.

The seat of the diocese is Trinity Episcopal Cathedral, Portland, Oregon.

Michael Joseph Hanley was elected tenth bishop of the Episcopal Diocese of Oregon at the diocese's annual convention on November 30, 2009. He was ordained to the episcopate and installed on April 10, 2010. 

Diana Akiyama was elected eleventh bishop of the diocese on August 28, 2020. She was consecrated on January 30, 2021, at the Trinity Episcopal Cathedral, Portland, Oregon. She is the first Japanese-American woman to be ordained a bishop in The Episcopal Church.

Bishops of Oregon

For more information on the bishops who have served the Episcopal Diocese of Oregon, see the diocesan website https://diocese-oregon.org/about/history/

Suffragan and assisting bishops
 Hal Raymond Gross, Suffragan Bishop, 1965–1979
 Sandy (Sanford Zangwill Kaye) Hampton, Assisting Bishop, 2008–2010 (previously Suffragan Bishop of Minnesota 1989–1996 and Assistant Bishop of Olympia, 1996–2003)

References

External links 
Official Homepage
Journal of the Annual Convention, Diocese of Oregon

Episcopal Church in Oregon
Oregon, Episcopal Diocese of
Province 8 of the Episcopal Church (United States)